Daeng is a district (amphoe) in the northwestern part of Rayong province, eastern Thailand.

Etymology
The name Pluak Daeng originates from the founding of the village. The villagers found an ant hill full of red termites (Thai: Pluak Daeng), different from those in other areas.

History
The area was originally part of Ban Khai district. The minor district (king amphoe) Pluak Daeng was established on 1 June 1970 consisting of the two tambons, Ta Sit and Pluak Daeng. It was upgraded to a full district on 25 March 1979.

Geography
Neighbouring districts are (from the east clockwise) Wang Chan, Ban Khai, Nikhom Phatthana of Rayong Province, Bang Lamung, Si Racha and Nong Yai of Chonburi province.

The important water resource is the Nong Pla Lai Reservoir.

Demography
Most of the Pluak Daeng populations are latent populations. Some are from Phitsanulok and Sukhothai or nearby provinces. They come to live here to work.

Administration

Central administration 
Pluak Daeng is divided into six sub-districts (tambons), which are further subdivided into 34 administrative villages (mubans).

Local administration 
There are two sub-district municipalities (thesaban tambons) in the district:
 Chomphon Chao Phraya consisting of parts of sub-district Ta Sit.
 Ban Pluak Daeng consisting of parts of sub-district Pluak Daeng.

There are six sub-district administrative organizations (SAO) in the district:
 Pluak Daeng consisting of parts of sub-district Pluak Daeng.
 Ta Sit consisting of parts of sub-district Ta Sit.
 Lahan consisting of sub-district Lahan.
 Maenam Khu consisting of sub-district Maenam Khu.
 Map Yang Phon consisting of sub-district Map Yang Phon.
 Nong Rai consisting of sub-district Nong Rai.

Economy
Pluak Daeng is considered an industrial estate area. It had five large industrial estates.

References

External links
amphoe.com

Pluak Daeng